The Phantom Agony is the first full-length studio album by Dutch symphonic metal band Epica. It was released in 2003 by the Dutch label Transmission Records. It is the first album recorded by guitarist Mark Jansen after his departure from the band After Forever. On this album, Jansen continues with the collection of songs that make up The Embrace That Smothers. The first three parts can be found on Prison of Desire (2000), After Forever's debut album, and the following three parts can be found on The Divine Conspiracy (2007), Epica's third album. These songs deal with the dangers of organized religion.

The album was re-released on 23 March 2013, which coincided with Epica's 10th anniversary Retrospect show, as a 2-disc expanded edition by Epica's former record label Transmission Records.

Track listing

Personnel
All credits adapted from the original release.
 

Epica
 Simone Simons – lead vocals
 Mark Jansen – rhythm guitar, grunts, screams
 Ad Sluijter – lead guitar
 Coen Janssen – synths, piano
 Yves Huts – bass
 Jeroen Simons – drums

Additional musicians
 Olaf Reitmeier – acoustic guitars on "Feint" and "Run for a Fall", engineer
 Annette Berryman – flute on "Run for a Fall"

Production
 Sascha Paeth – producer, engineer, mixing
 Mark Jansen – orchestral arrangements
 Coen Janssen – orchestral and choir arrangements
 Robert Hunecke-Rizzo – orchestral arrangements
 Hans van Vuuren – executive producer, coordination and research
 Peter van 't Riet – mastering

Orchestra
 Thomas Glöckner – violin
 Andreas Pfaff – violin
 Tobias Rempe – violin
 Marie-Theres Stumpf – viola
 David Schlage – viola
 Jörn Kellermann – cello
 Cordula Rhode – cello
 Andrè Neygenfind – contrabass

Choir
 Melvin Edmonsen – bass
 Previn Moore – tenor
 Bridget Fogle – alto
 Cinzia Rizzo – alto
 Annie Goeble – soprano
 Amanda Somerville – soprano, vocal coach

Singles

The Phantom Agony

"The Phantom Agony" was the first single.

Track listing
 "The Phantom Agony" (Single Version) - 4:35
 "Veniality" - 4:36
 "Façade of Reality" - 8:17
 "Veniality" (Orchestral Version) - 4:37

Feint
Feint was the second single.

Track listing
 "Feint" - 4:18
 "Feint (Piano Version)" - 4:53
 "Triumph of Defeat" - 3:56
 "Seif al Din" - 5:46

Cry for the Moon

Cry for the Moon was the third single. The song originated from a two-track demo released under the band name Sahara Dust, with the other track being a demo version of "Illusive Consensus".

Track listing
Demo
 "Cry for the Moon" - 6:46
 "Illusive Consensus" - 5:00

Single
 "Cry for the Moon" (Single Version) - 3:33
 "Cry for the Moon" - 6:44
 "Run for a Fall" (Single Version) - 4:29
 "Run for a Fall" - 6:31

References

Epica (band) albums
2003 debut albums
Transmission (record label) albums